Blagar is a Papuan language of Pantar island in the Alor archipelago of Indonesia. The Tereweng dialect spoken on Tereweng Island off the southeast coast of Pantar is sometimes considered a separate language.

The increasing prominence of Indonesian has been putting pressure on the Blagar language although the language is still used by all age groups. By the 1970s Indonesian replaced Blagar as the language of churches and mosques, and in the early 2000s the spread of Indonesian was furthered by the introduction of electricity on Pura Island.

Phonology

Vowels 

Blagar has five vowels, with a sharp contrast between short and long vowels.

Consonants

Grammar 

The morphological typology of Blagar is categorized as isolating.

Writing system 

Another writing system is also used, which is phonemic and is similar to the writing system of Indonesian.

References

Bibliography

External links 

 Alphabet and pronunciation
 Audio speech of the Pura dialect of Blagar
 Description of the Blagar language
 Blagar Swadesh list at TransNewGuinea.org
 Blagar Swadesh List by The Rosetta Project at the Internet Archive
 Genesis, Mark, and Acts in the Pura dialect of the Blagar language of Indonesia
 Blagar Dadibira Collection at The Language Archive

Alor–Pantar languages
Languages of Indonesia